The 1984–85 Essex Senior Football League season was the 14th in the history of Essex Senior Football League, a football competition in England.

League table

The league featured 16 clubs which competed in the league last season, no new clubs joined the league this season.

League table

References

Essex Senior Football League seasons
1984–85 in English football leagues